The 1973–74 FIBA European Champions Cup was the 17th edition of the European top-tier level professional basketball club competition FIBA European Champions Cup (now called EuroLeague). The Final was held at the Palais des Sports de Beaulieu, in Nantes, France, on April 3, 1974. It was won by Real Madrid, who defeated Ignis Varese in the finals, by a result of 84–82. This was the 5th consecutive final for Varese, and the first of three consecutive finals played between these two teams.

Competition system

 26 teams (European national domestic league champions, plus the then current title holders), playing in a tournament system, played knock-out rounds on a home and away basis. The aggregate score of both games decided the winner.
 The 8 teams qualified for the Quarterfinals were divided into two groups of four. Every team played against the other three in its group in consecutive home-and-away matches, so that every two of these games counted as a single win or defeat (point difference being a decisive factor there). In case of a tie between two or more teams after the group stage, the following criteria were used: 1) one-to-one games between the teams; 2) basket average; 3) individual wins and defeats.
 The group winners and the runners-up of the Quarterfinal Group Stage qualified for the Semifinals. The final was played at a predetermined venue.

First round

|}

*FIBA cancelled this match and declared Union Wienerberger winner.

**This match played as a single game in Belgrade.

Second round

|}

Automatically qualified to the group stage
 Ignis Varese (title holder)

Quarterfinals group stage
The quarterfinals were played with a round-robin system, in which every Two Game series (TGS) constituted as one game for the record.

Semifinals

Final
April 3, Palais des Sports de Beaulieu, Nantes

|}

Awards

FIBA European Champions Cup Finals Top Scorer
 Dino Meneghin ( Ignis Varese)

References

External links
1973–74 FIBA European Champions Cup
 1973–74 FIBA European Champions Cup
 Champions Cup 1973–74 Line-ups and Stats

EuroLeague seasons
FIBA